In North America, a sideshow is an extra, secondary production associated with a circus, carnival, fair, or other such attraction.

Types

There are four main types of classic sideshow attractions:

The Ten-in-One offers a program of ten sequential acts under one tent for a single admission price. The ten-in-one might be partly a freak show exhibiting "human oddities" (including "born freaks" such as midgets, giants or persons with other deformities, or "made freaks" like tattooed people, fat people or "human skeletons"- extremely thin men often "married" to the fat lady, like Isaac W. Sprague). However, for variety's sake, the acts in a ten-in-one would also include "working acts" who would perform magic tricks or daredevil stunts. In addition, the freak show performers might also perform acts or stunts, and would often sell souvenirs like "giant's rings" or "pitch cards" with their photos and life stories. The ten-in-one would often end in a "blowoff" or "ding," an extra act not advertised on the outside, which could be viewed for an additional fee. The blowoff act would be described provocatively, often as something deemed too strong for women and children, such as pickled punks.
The Single-O is a single attraction, for example a single curiosity like the "Bonnie and Clyde Death Car" or Hitler's staff car, a "Giant Rat" (actually usually a nutria) or other unusual animal, a "What Is It?" (often a convincing but artificial monstrosity like the Fiji Mermaid) or a geek show often billed as "See the Victim of Drug Abuse."
A Museum Show which might be deceptively billed as "World's Greatest Freaks Past and Present," is a sideshow in which the exhibits are usually not alive. It might include tanks of piranhas or cages with unusual animals, stuffed freak animals or other exotic items like the weapons or cars allegedly used by famous murderers. Some of the exhibits might even be dummies or photographs of the billed attractions. It could still be truthfully billed with the claim "$1,000 reward if not absolutely real — please do not touch or feed the animals on exhibit". The Single-O and the Museum Show are usually operated as "grind shows," meaning that patrons may enter at any time, viewing the various exhibits at their leisure. 
 A Girl Show was sometimes offered in which women were the primary attraction. These could range from the revue (such as a "Broadway Revue") with fully clothed performers to the racier "kootch" or "hootchie-kootchie" show (a strip show) which might play either partly clothed or "strong" (nude).

Early history and acts

By the 1830s, "outside shows" began to be established alongside travelling circuses. Initially, the circuses distanced themselves from the sideshows, but in 1850, a relationship was established between them.

"Working acts" often exhibited a number of stunts that could be counted on to draw crowds. These stunts used little-known methods and offered the elements of danger and excitement. Such acts included fire eating, sword swallowing, knife throwing, body piercing, lying on a bed of nails, walking up a ladder of sharp swords, and more. The renewed attention to these feats has prompted a new round of oversimplified or inaccurate explanations, leading some inexperienced people to attempt them without adequate training often resulting in injury and sometimes even death.

Decline and revival

Interest in sideshows declined as television made it easy (and free) to see the world's most exotic attractions. Moreover, viewing "human oddities" became distasteful as the public conscience changed, and many localities passed laws forbidding the exhibition of freaks. The performers often protested (to no avail) that they had no objection to the sideshow, especially since it provided not only a good income for them, but in many cases it provided their only possible job. The sideshow seemed destined for oblivion, until only a few exemplars of the ten-in-one remained. In modern times, sideshow performers are often individual professionals or groups. A greater number of "Single O" attractions still tour carnivals.

In the 1940s, Ward Hall began the World of Wonders Amazement Show, which is still running today. It is the oldest carnival sideshow organization in America and is currently owned and ran by Thomas Breen. 
In 1970, John Strong, Jr (son of John Strong of The John Strong 3 Ring Tented Circus) began a 47 year continuous run of traveling sideshow, The Strong Sideshow.  Several acts and artifacts toured over the years such as the 5-legged dog, Chupacabra, a 2-headed cow, and a mummy. John Jr. performed all the live acts himself for several years including sword swallowing, fire eating, bed of nails blade box and electric chair.  After living the lifestyle for a lifetime, The Strong Sideshow is now in residency at "The Sideshow Museum", in Uranus, Missouri.  

In the early 1990s, Jim Rose developed a modern sideshow called "the Jim Rose Circus", reinventing the sideshow with two types of acts that would attract modern audiences and stay within legal bounds. The show featured acts reviving traditional sideshow stunts and carrying some of them to extremes, and "fringe" artists (often exhibiting extreme body modification) performing bizarre or masochistic acts like eating insects, lifting weights by means of hooks inserted in their body piercings, or stapling currency to their forehead. The show drew audiences at venues unknown to old-time sideshows, like rock clubs and the 1992 Lollapalooza festival. The Jim Rose Circus held its last known performance in 2013 at The London Burlesque Festival. The impact of the Jim Rose Circus on pop culture inspired a new wave of performers. There are now more sideshow performers than at any other time in the genre's history. At the same time in Canada, Scott McClelland, grandson of itinerant showman N.P. Lewchuk, formed Carnival Diablo, a show that performs frequently to this day. The success of these shows sparked a growing number of performers to revive the traditional sideshow arts, taught by sideshow veterans, and many now perform in spot engagements from rock clubs and comedy clubs to corporate events. 

"Sideshows by the Seashore", sponsored by Coney Island USA in Brooklyn, NY has performed since 1983, and tours under the name "Coney Island Circus Sideshow". Circus historian and collector Ken Harck ran the Brothers Grim Sideshow, which toured with the OzzFest music festival in the summer of 2006 and 2007. Sideshow celebrity and multiple world record breaker Chayne Hultgren 'The Space Cowboy' owns Australia's largest traveling oddity museum 'The Mutant Barnyard' and along with his partner Zoe Ellis 'AKA: Zoe L'amore' they run 'Sideshow Wonderland', one of the world's most successful sideshows described as a modern high energy human oddity exhibit or freakshow cabaret.

The Robin Marks Foundation is a nonprofit organization to elevate the image of sideshow, offer job opportunities for professionals, and continued education as well as to aid in educating the public about what it is to be part of the sideshow. The Southern Sideshow Hootenanny is another nonprofit organization dedicated to celebrating and fostering growth within the sideshow industry. Both have come about because of a revival in the art form and offer several benefits for members and patrons.

See also
The Circus of Horrors

References

Sources
 "A Pictorial History of the American Carnival," by Joe McKennon (Popular Press, Bowling Green, Ohio. Copyright 1972 by Joe McKennon.)

External links

 americancarny.com American Carny: True Tales from the Circus Sideshow
 Showhistory.com: History of the Sideshow
 Sideshow World Preserving the Past....Promoting the Future of Sideshow
Dictionary of Carnival and Sideshow Slang
 House of Deception bibliography of sideshow history

 
Circus skills
American culture
Entertainment in the United States
Theatrical genres